247 (two hundred [and] forty-seven) is the natural number following 246 and preceding 248.

Additionally, 247 is:
 a semiprime.
 a brilliant number (the product of two primes with the same number of digits).
 a pentagonal number.
 palindromic in base 18 (DD18).
 a Harshad number in bases 10, 14, 19, 20, 27, 39, 40, 58, 77, 79, 115, 118, 229 and 235.
 the smallest number which can be expressed as the difference between two integers that contain together all the decimal digits 0–9. i.e. 247 = 50123 - 49876.

References 

Integers